The Order of the Crown was founded in 1913 (1332 AH) by Shah Ahmad Shah Qajar before his coronation as the highest dynastical and state order. Until 1926 it existed in two classes (with breast star and sash for both). The 1st class had a collar (neck chain with badge as a pendant) reserved for the Shahanshah and the Crown-Prince. The Order was preserved in Iran after the fall of the Qajars. Until the reform of the Order in 1938/39 the sash was blue with thin green-white borders, but after the reform was corn-yellow with sky-blue edges.

The first Shah from the Pahlavi dynasty reformed the order at the end of the year in 1938/39. The order was the senior one after the dynastic Order of Pahlavi. It was abolished in 1979 following the Iranian revolution.

See also
 Lion and Sun

References

External links

 Orders & Decorations of Pahlavi dynasty are exhibited in the ORDER section of the website

Civil awards and decorations of Iran
Pahlavi Iran
Dynastic orders
Awards established in 1913
Awards disestablished in 1979